The MTV Video Music Award for Best Collaboration was first introduced to the MTV Video Music Awards in 2007 under the name Most Earthshattering Collaboration, as the VMAs were revamped and a few new categories were added to the show. When MTV brought the VMAs back to their old format in 2008, this category did not return. It was not until 2010 that the category was reintroduced under the name Best Collaboration.

Beyoncé has received the most wins in this category with three moonmen, followed by Taylor Swift and Lady Gaga with two moonmen. Rihanna and Ariana Grande are the most nominated artist with six nominations, followed by Beyoncé with five nominations.

Recipients

Records and statistics
 Most wins:
 Beyoncé – 3 wins
 Taylor Swift – 2 wins
 Lady Gaga – 2 wins
 Most nominations, as of 2021

See also
 MTV Europe Music Award for Best Female
 MTV Europe Music Award for Best Male

References

MTV Video Music Awards
Musical collaboration awards
Awards established in 2007